Hrishikesh Pandey (born 16 May 1992) better known by his stage name Rishiking is an Indian music composer, rapper, filmmaker and screenwriter. Rishiking is the founder of the motion picture production company Mahagatha and Director of Folk Culture India Association. He is the creative director of  International Film Festival of Madhya Pradesh IFFMP. His films and songs have a mixture of awareness and solutions for the society that brought him recognition and praise from the Government of India. He changed the way of rapping in India and gave new direction to the society through rap. He along with P Narahari IAS launched the musical program Swachhta Ke Sur in 2020 under Swachh Bharat Mission to make people aware through music, which included Bollywood singer Shaan, Shankar Mahadevan, Javed Ali, Payal Dev and Dev Negi.

Rishiking, as he is known to friends and colleagues claims to be a self-made professional and has learned the craft on his own.

Career
Rishiking began his career as a teacher and after a year he moved to the creative department at own advertising agency and gradually established himself as a director and producer of ad films.

Music career
Rishiking started his music career with singer Shaan in 2016 with a song "School Chale Hum". And also in the year 2016 Rishiking made Ho Halla a swatchhta anthem song for Indore city together with P Narahari IAS, which was sung again by Shaan and it was the biggest hit to make Indore's people aware towards cleanness and by this cleanness movement Indore got the number one tag for cleanness across all over India. After the success of ho halla song and to celebrate the title of Number one clean city of India, Indore was decided to make this success memorable so far that a live musical concert held by Indore Municipal Corporation on 23 December 2017 In this concert Rishiking introduce himself as a rapper with the company of singer Shaan on the same stage.

Filmography

Discography

Hindi Songs

Telugu Songs

References

External links

 
 

 
Indian male composers
Indian rappers
Indian record producers
Jingle composers
Film directors from Madhya Pradesh
1992 births
Living people